Lady Haeryangwon was the daughter of Seon-Pil who became the 30th wife of Taejo of Goryeo. Her father, Seon-Pil, helped Wang Geon in established the Goryeo dynasty while he served as a Silla's general. Then, he returned to Goryeo in 930 and Wang (a.k.a. Taejo) gave Seon-Pil special treatment. After that, Taejo then took his daughter as his consort.

References

External links
해량원부인 on Encykorea .

Year of birth unknown
Year of death unknown
Consorts of Taejo of Goryeo
People from Gumi, North Gyeongsang